Bridgewater Bridge may refer to:

in Australia
 Bridgewater Bridge (Tasmania)

in the United States
Bridgewater Corners Bridge, Bridgewater, Vermont, listed on the NRHP in Vermont
Bridgewater Bridge (Bridgewater, Pennsylvania), a contributing element in Bridgewater Historic District (Bridgewater, Pennsylvania)